Zhijun Zhang (born November 1971) is a Chinese engineer and professor from Tsinghua University, Beijing, China was named Fellow of the Institute of Electrical and Electronics Engineers (IEEE) in 2015 for contributions to antenna design and propagation modeling in mobile communication devices.

References 

Fellow Members of the IEEE
Living people
1971 births
Academic staff of Tsinghua University
21st-century Chinese engineers